"Goalie Goalie" (stylized as Goalie Goalie! and Goalie Goalie 2018!) is a 2018 PowerHouse Records release featuring an international line-up of singers and artists, the Iranian Swedish artist Arash, the Russian singer Nyusha, Cuban-American rapper Pitbull and rising American record producer Blanco Brown on the occasion of the 2018 FIFA World Cup.

Background
The song is credited on iTunes as Arash featuring Nyusha, Pitbull & Blanco. Released on 14 June 2018 to coincide with the launch of the World Cup in Russia, it was featured during the games' opening event in Moscow.

The song was co-written by Mohombi, Cederic Lorrain, Brown, Pitbull, Alexandru Cotoi, Andrei Ropcea and Cezar Cazano and produced by Alexandru Cotoi with Andrei Ropcea and Brown as co-producers. It was published by PowerHouse Publishing, Sony Atv / Abuelo y Tia songs.

Music video
A music video was also released by Artist Preserve London and Damian Fyffe Productions. The music video was directed by Farbod Koshtinat with Kasra Pezeshki as executive producer and Carlos Veron as director of photography.

References

External links
Arash YouTube channel: Arash Nyusha Pitbull Blanco - Goalie Goalie (Official video)

2018 songs
2018 singles
Arash (singer) songs
Pitbull (rapper) songs
Macaronic songs
Songs written by Mohombi
Songs written by Pitbull (rapper)
Songs written by Alexandru Cotoi